The convertible mark (Serbo-Croatian: ,; sign: KM; code: BAM) is the currency of Bosnia and Herzegovina. While the currency and its subunits are uniform for both constituent polities of Bosnia and Herzegovina, namely the Federation of Bosnia and Herzegovina (FBiH) and Republika Srpska (RS), the designs of the KM 10, KM 20, KM 50, and KM 100 banknotes are differentiated for each polity.

History 

The convertible mark was established by the 1995 Dayton Agreement. It replaced the Bosnia and Herzegovina dinar, Croatian kuna and Yugoslav novi dinar as the single currency of Bosnia and Herzegovina in 1998. Mark refers to the Deutsche Mark, the currency to which it was pegged at par.

Etymology 

The names derive from German. The Official Gazette of BiH, Official newspaper of FBiH and other official documents recognised pfenig or пфениг (depending on the script; Bosnian and Serbian use both Latin and Cyrillic equally, while Croatian uses only Latin) as the name of the subdivision.

Banknotes of 50 fenings circulated from 1998 to 2003. They were denoted "50 KONVERTIBILNIH PFENIGA" / "50 КОНВЕРТИБИЛНИХ ПФЕНИГА"; technically, the word convertible should not qualify the word pfenig because only the mark is convertible. (See Errors for all of the errors on banknotes and coins.) Coins of 10, 20, and 50 pfenigs have circulated since 1998 (the 5-pfenigs coin was released in 2006). All of them are inscribed "" / "" on the obverse. The misspelling / has never been corrected, and it took such a hold that it was officially adopted and not recognised as incorrect.

Plurals and cases 

Serbo-Croatian is subject to a case system. For the purposes of pluralizing currency terms, three situations are relevant:

In combination with numbers 1, 21, 31, 41, 51, 61, 71, 81, 101, 1001, et cetera (i. e. all numbers ending in "1" except 11), nouns use the nominative case singular (the base form):
màrka (màr: a – short vowel, rising tone) and pfénig/féning ((p)fé: e – short vowel, rising tone)
In combination with numbers whose final digit is 2, 3, or 4 (except 12, 13, and 14), nouns use the genitive case singular (the "paucal form"):
màrke (màr: a – short vowel, rising tone) and pféniga/féninga ((p)fé: e – short vowel, rising tone)
In combination with numbers 0, 5, 6, 7, 8, 9, 10, 11, 12, 13, 14, 15, 16, 17, 18, 19, 20, 100, 1000, 10000, et cetera (i. e. all numbers ending in 5, 6, 7, 8, 9, 0, 11, 12, 13, or 14), nouns use the genitive case plural:
mȁrākā (mȁr: a – short vowel, falling tone; vowels ā are not accented but have genitive length) and pfénīgā/fénīngā ((p)fé: e – short vowel, rising tone; vowels ī and ā are not accented but have genitive length)
(For further information on accents in BSC, see Serbo-Croatian phonology and Shtokavian dialect#Accentuation.)

For the pfenig, the plural is pfeniga/feninga with a short unaccented a, whereas the genitive plural is the same pfeniga/feninga but with a long unaccented i and a. A syllable after an accented syllable whose vowel is pronounced long and with a continuous tone, i. e. neither rising or falling, is said to have a genitive length (although the word does not necessarily have to be in the genitive case in order to have genitive length on its syllable; it can be in the locative also).

These matters should be noted when the local names are used in English. For example, the English plural "ten pfenigas" / "ten feningas" is incorrect because the final a in the BSC plural pfeniga/feninga already indicates the plural. Therefore "ten pfenigs" / "ten fenings" should be used. The Central Bank of Bosnia and Herzegovina (CBBH) uses "fenings" as the English plural. Likewise, "twenty-one markas", "two markes", and "twelve marakas" are incorrect; "twenty-one marks", "two marks", and "twelve marks", respectively, are correct.

Coins 

In December 1998, coins were introduced in denominations of 10, 20 and 50 fenings. Coins of 5 fenings, KM 1, KM 2 and KM 5 were introduced later. The coins were designed by Bosnian designer Kenan Zekic and minted at the Royal Mint in Llantrisant (Wales, UK).

Banknotes 

In 1998, notes were introduced in denominations of 50 fenings, KM 1, KM 5, KM 10, KM 20, KM 50, and KM 100. KM 200 notes were added in 2002, while the 50-fening and KM 1 and KM 5 notes were later withdrawn from circulation. All current notes are valid throughout the nation.

The Central Bank of Bosnia Herzegovina issues the banknotes, with distinct designs for the constituent polities of the Federation of Bosnia and Herzegovina and the Republika Srpska,1 except for the largest denomination, i. e. the KM 200 note. On the notes for the Republika Srpska, inscriptions are printed first in Cyrillic and then Latin script, and vice versa. Banknotes, with the exception of the KM 200 note, are printed by the French company Oberthur.

Federation of Bosnia and Herzegovina issues

Republika Srpska issues

Nationwide issues
The portraits of Ivan Franjo Jukić and Meša Selimović, which are both writers, were featured by consensus between both entities on all KM 1 and KM 5 notes used between 1998 and 2010.

On 15 May 2002, a KM 200 banknote, designed by Robert Kalina, was introduced during a promotion that was held in the Central Bank of BH. The reverse design which depicts a bridge is meant to resemble the euro banknotes, which were also designed by Robert Kalina. After an international tender, the Austrian company Oesterreichische Banknoten und Sicherheitsdruck GmbH (OeBS) in Vienna was chosen to print the notes. Initially, six million were ordered.

Exchange rates

Initially the mark was pegged to the Deutsche mark at par. Since the replacement of the German mark by the euro in 2002, the Bosnian convertible mark uses the same fixed exchange rate to euro that the German mark had (that is,

Errors 

Banknotes and coins of Bosnia and Herzegovina have many mistakes and inconsistencies.

Officially, only one banknote has not been released in circulation because of a mistake, even though other banknotes with mistakes had been issued.

Banknote examples 

These are the most important mistakes that have been noticed to date:
 Both designs of the 50 fening banknote imprinted the adjective "convertible" next to the noun "pfenig", although only the mark has the "convertible" prefix ("50 KONVERTIBILNIH PFENIGA" / "50 КОНВЕРТИБИЛНИХ ПФЕНИГА").
 The KM 1 banknote for Republika Srpska was imprinted "ИВО АНДРИЂ / IVO ANDRIĐ" instead of "ИВО АНДРИЋ / IVO ANDRIĆ". This banknote was immediately removed from circulation.
 Both designs of the KM 5 banknote had the Cyrillic word "five" incorrectly printed in Latin script on its reverse ("PET КОНВЕРТИБИЛНИХ МАРАКА", instead of "ПЕТ ..."). Also, Meša Selimović's name is written in Cyrillic as "Меща Селимовић" instead of "Meша Селимовић" (the letter щ is not used in any of the Balkan Cyrillic-written languages except Bulgarian).
 The KM 10 banknote for Republika Srpska, first series, 1998, had Aleksa Šantić's name printed in Latin script although it should have been printed in Cyrillic script as it is on all other examples of the 1998 series.
 Both designs of the KM 100 banknote were incorrectly printed with the Cyrillic abbreviation of the Central Bank of Bosnia and Herzegovina with "Џ / Dž" instead of "Ц / C" (i. e. "ЏББХ / DžBBH" instead of "ЦББХ / CBBH") in the safety bar.
 In 2017, Edin Bujak of the Department of Archaeology of the Faculty of Philosophy in Sarajevo noticed a mistake on the KM 10 banknote for the Federation of B&H. The picture of the stećak on the reverse is actually a picture of a stećak from Križevići, Olovo and not from the Radimlja necropolis as stated on the banknote. The Central Bank of Bosnia and Herzegovina confirmed this mistake, and it will be corrected in future printing of the banknote.

Coin examples 

These are the most important mistakes that have been noticed to date:

 The name of the subdivision of the convertible mark has been incorrectly engraved on coins: the word "pfenig" has been engraved as "fening". This mistake has taken such a hold, especially because there were and are no 50 pfenig/fening banknotes in circulation, that "fening" was officially adopted as the name of the hundredth unit of the KM and is not recognized as incorrect.

See also
Currencies related to the euro
Economy of Bosnia and Herzegovina

Notes

References

External links
Historical and current banknotes of Bosnia and Herzegovina

Circulating currencies
Currencies introduced in 1998
currency
Fixed exchange rate